The Tswana (singular Motswana) are a Bantu-speaking ethnic group native to Southern Africa. The Tswana language is a principal member of the Sotho-Language group. Ethnic Tswana made up approximately 85% of the population of Botswana in 2011.

Batswana are the native people of south and eastern Botswana, and the Gauteng, North West, Northern Cape and provinces of South Africa, where the majority of Batswana are located.

History

Early history of Batswana

The Batswana are descended mainly from Bantu-speaking tribes along with the Khoi-San. Tswana tribe migrated southward to Africa around 600 CE, living in tribal enclaves as farmers and herders. Several Iron Age cultures flourished around the 900 CE, including the Toutswemogala Hill Iron Age settlement. The Toutswe were in the eastern region of what is now Botswana, relying on Tswana cattle breed held in kraals as their source of wealth. The arrival of the ancestors of the Tswana-speakers who came to control the region (from the Vaal River to Botswana) has yet to be dated precisely. Although CE 600 seems to be a consensus estimate. This massive cattle-raising complex prospered until 1300 CE or so. All these various peoples were connected to trade routes that ran via the Limpopo River to the Indian Ocean, and trade goods from Asia, such as beads, made their way to Botswana. Most likely in exchange for ivory, gold, and rhinoceros horn. Members of the Bakwena, a chieftaincy under a legendary leader named Kgabo II, made their way into the southern Kalahari by CE 1500, at the latest, and his people drove the Bakgalagadi inhabitants west into the desert. Over the years, several offshoots of the Bakwena moved into adjoining territories. The Bangwaketse occupied areas to the west, while the Bangwato moved northeast into formerly Bakalanga areas. Not long afterward, a Bangwato offshoot known as the Batawana migrated into the Okavango Delta, probably in the 1790s. The first written records relating to modern-day Botswana appear in 1824. What these records show is that the Bangwaketse had become the predominant power in the region. Under the rule of Makaba II, the Bangwaketse kept vast herds of cattle in well-protected desert areas and used their military prowess to raid their neighbors. Other chiefdoms in the area, by this time, had capitals of 10,000 or so and were fairly prosperous. One of these famous capitals was Kaditshwene which was the cultural capital of the Bahurutshe people, one of the principal Tswana tribes and a center of manufacturing and trading, it had been founded in the late 1400s on the site of iron and copper ore deposits. The remains of another major Tswana capital, Kweneng' Ruins, are found in Suikerbosrand Nature Reserve in South Africa. It was occupied from the 15th to the 19th century AD and was the largest of several sizeable settlements inhabited by Tswana speakers before European arrival. Several circular stone-walled family compounds are spread out over an area of 10  km long and 2  km wide.

Batswana–Boer Wars

During the 1840s and 1850s trade with Cape Colony-based merchants opened up and enabled the Batswana chiefdoms to rebuild. The Bakwena, Bangwaketse, Bangwato and Batawana cooperated to control the lucrative ivory trade, and then used the proceeds to import horses and guns, which in turn enabled them to establish control over what is now Botswana. This process was largely complete by 1880, and thus the Bushmen, the Bakalanga, the Bakgalagadi, the Batswapong and other current minorities were subjugated by the Batswana. Following the Great Trek, Afrikaners from the Cape Colony established themselves on the borders of Botswana in the Transvaal. In 1852 a coalition of Tswana chiefdoms led by Sechele I resisted Afrikaner incursions which culminated with the pivotal showdown of the Battle of Dimawe fought with artillery and long range rifles as well as musket fire. Although it was the Boer Commando led by the Boer Commandant-General Pieter Scholtz and Paul Kruger, as an officer leading the Boer advance who started the offensive, it was they who ended up on the retreat followed by Batswana's retaliatory attacks into the then Transvaal's Marique district in which Boer settlements, villages and farms were scotched. After about eight years of intermittent tensions and hostilities, eventually came to a peace agreement in Potchefstroom in 1860. From that point on, the modern-day border between South Africa and Botswana was agreed on, and the Afrikaners and Batswana traded and worked together peacefully.

Battle of Khutiyabasadi

The Batawana's (Tswana tribe/clan) fight against invading Ndebele of 1884. When the amaNdebele arrived at Toteng, they thus found the village abandoned. But, as they settled down to enjoy their bloodless conquest, about seventy mounted Batawana under Kgosi Moremi's personal command appeared, all armed with breech-loading rifles. In classic commando style the cavalry began to harass the much larger enemy force with lethal hit and run volleys. Meanwhile, another group of traditionally armed subjects of the Kgosi also made their presence known.

At this point the amaNdebele commander, Lotshe, took the bait dividing his army into two groups. One party pursued Moremi's small force, while the other fruitlessly tried to catch up to what they believed was the main body of Batawana.

As the invaders generally lacked guns, as well as horses, Moremi continued to harass his pursuers, inflicting significant casualties while remaining unscathed.

The primary mission of Moremi's men was not, however, to inflict losses on the enemy so much as to ensnare them into a well designed trap. His force thus gradually retreated northward towards Khutiyabasadi, drawing the amaNdebele to where the main body of defenders were already well entrenched.

As they approached the swamp area south Khutiyabasadi, Lotshe struggled to reunite his men, perhaps sensing that they were approaching a showdown. But, instead, Moremi's Batawana, now joined by Qhunkunyane's Wayeyi drew the amaNdebele still deeper into the swamps.

In this area of poor visibility, due to the thick tall reeds, the Batawana and Wayeyi were able to employ additional tricks to lure the invaders towards their ultimate doom. At one point a calf and its mother were tied to separate trees to make Lotshe's men think that they were finally catching up to their main prize, the elusive Batawana cattle. As they pressed forward the amaNdebele were further unnerved by additional hit and run attacks and sniping by small bands of Batawana marksmen. Certainly they could not have been comfortable in the unfamiliar Okavango environment.

It was at Kuthiyabasadi that the defenders' trap was finally sprung. At the time, the place was an island dominated by high reeds and surrounded to the west by deep water. In the reeds, three well armed Batawana regiments, joined by local Wayeyi, waited patiently. There they had built a small wooden platform, upon which several men could be seen from across the channel, as well tunnels and entrenchments for concealment. The amaNdebele were drawn to the spot by the appearance of Batawana cavalry who crossed the channel to the island in their sight. In addition, cattle were placed on a small islet adjacent to Kuthiyabasadi, while a group of soldiers now made themselves visible by standing up on the wooden platform. Also at the location was a papyrus bridge that had been purposely weakened at crucial spots. Surveying the scene, Lotshe ordered his men to charge across the bridge over what he presumably thought was no more than a small stream. As planned, the bridge collapsed when full of amaNdebele, who were thus unexpectedly thrown into a deep water channel. Few if any would have known how to swim.

Additional waves of amaNdebele found themselves pinned down by their charging compatriots along the river bank, which was too deep for them to easily ford. With the enemy thus in disarray, the signal was given for the main body of defenders to emerge from their tunnels and trenches. A barrage of bullets cut through Lotshe's lines from three sides, quickly turning the battle into a one-sided massacre. It is said that after the main firing had ceased, the Wayeyi used their mekoro to further attack the survivors trapped in the river, hitting them on the head with their oars. In this way, many more were drowned. By the time the fighting was over, the blood is reported to have turned the water along the course of the river black. While the total number of casualties at Khutiyabasadi cannot be precisely known, observers in Bulawayo at the time confirm that over 2,500 men had left on Lotshe's expedition and less than 500 returned. While the bulk of the amaNdebele losses are believed to have occurred in and around Khutiyabasadi itself, survivors of the battle were also killed while being mercilessly pursued by the Batawana cavalry. Moremi was clearly determined to send a strong message to Lobengula that his regiments were no match. Still others died of exhaustion and hunger while trying to make their way home across the dry plains south of Chobe; the somewhat more hospitable route through Gammangwato having been blocked by Khama. While the battle at Khutiyabasadi was a great victory for the Batawana and defeat for the amaNdebele, for the Wayeyi of the region the outcome is said to have been a mixed blessing. While they had shared in the victory over the hated Amandebele, one of its consequences was a tightening of Batawana authority in the area over them, as Moremi settled for a period at nearby Nokaneng.

First Matabele War 

The First Matabele War was fought between 1893 and 1894 in modern-day Zimbabwe. The British South Africa Company had no more than 750 troops in the British South Africa Company's Police, with an undetermined number of possible colonial volunteers and an additional 700 Tswana (Bechuana) allies who marched on Bulawayo from the south commandeered by Khama III, the most influential of the Batswana chiefs, and a staunch ally of the British. The Salisbury and Fort Victoria columns marched into Bulawayo on 4 November 1893. The Imperial column from Bechuanaland was nowhere to be seen. They had set march on 18 October heading north for Bulawayo and had a minor skirmish with the Matabele near Mphoengs on 2 November. They finally reached Bulawayo on 15 November, a delay which probably saved the Chartered Company's then newly occupied territory being annexed to the imperial Bechuanaland Protectorate.

Bophuthatswana 

The Bophuthatswana Territorial Authority was created in 1961, and in June 1972 Bophuthatswana was declared a self-governing state. On 6 December 1977 this 'homeland' was granted independence by the South African government. Bophuthatswana's capital city was Mmabatho and 99% of its population was Tswana speaking. In March 1994, Bophuthatswana was placed under the control of two administrators, Tjaart van der Walt and Job Mokgoro. The small, widespread pieces of land were reincorporated into South Africa on 27 April 1994. Bophuthatswana now forms part of the North West, Free State, Northern Cape, and Gauteng provinces.

Dynasties and tribe

Botswana

The republic of Botswana (formerly the British protectorate of Bechuanaland) is named for the Tswana people. The country's eight major tribes/clans speak Tswana, which is also called Setswana. All have a traditional Paramount Chief, styled Kgosikgolo, who is entitled to a seat in the Ntlo ya Dikgosi (an advisory body to the country's Parliament). The Tswana dynasties are all related. A person who lives in Botswana is a Motswana and the plural is Batswana. The three main branches of the Tswana tribe formed during the 17th century. Three brothers, Kwena, Ngwaketse and Ngwato, broke away from their father, Chief Malope, to establish their own tribes in Molepolole, Kanye and Serowe, probably in response to drought and expanding populations in search of pasture and arable land.

The principal Tswana tribes/clans are the:
 Bakwena
 Balete
 Bangwato
 BaNgwaketse
 Barolong
 Bataung
 Batlhaping
 Batlôkwa

South Africa
The largest number of ethnic Tswana people is located in modern-day South Africa. They are one of the largest ethnic groups in the country, and the Tswana language is one of eleven official languages in South Africa. There were over 4 million Tswana speakers in the country in 2012, with North West Province having a majority of 2,200,000 Tswana speakers. From 1948 to 1994, South African Tswana people were defined by the Apartheid regime to be citizens of Bophuthatswana, one of ten bantustans set up for the purpose of defending the policy of denying black Africans citizenship in South Africa.

Setswana food and cuisine

Pap is a staple food made from cornmeal which is often eaten alongside meat or vegetables, as is done in much of Africa. Borotho is a bread made from various types of flour. The most popular sorghum porridge is Ting. Bogobe jwa Logala/Sengana is a traditional Setswana dish prepared from sorghum porridge mixed/cooked with milk. Seswaa is Botswana's national dish and is often served at weddings, funerals, and other celebrations. Seswaa is a pounded or shredded meat and often served with Bogobe (Porridge). Madila is a sour cultured milk prepared from cow and goat milk over a period of time until fully matured for consumption. Traditionally madila were prepared using Lekuka a leather sack or bag used in processing and storing madila. Madila is also traditionally used as relish, eaten with pap. It can also be used in popular Tswana breakfast meal, motogo, to give the soft porridge that sour and milky taste.

Culture and attire
Batswana wear a cotton fabric known in Setswana as Leteisi and Sotho as Shweshwe. This fabric is often used for wedding celebrations and other traditional celebrations. In Setswana tradition mothers wear mogagolwane, a checkered small blanket during traditional baby-showers, and married women during traditional weddings are identified by it, as well as during various initiation ceremonies. Even during funerals Batswana women don mogagolwane.

Music
Tswana music is mostly vocal and performed, sometimes without drums depending on the occasion; it also makes heavy use of string instruments. Tswana folk music has instruments such as Setinkane (a Botswana version of miniature piano), Segankure/Segaba (a Botswana version of the Chinese instrument Erhu), Moropa (Meropa -plural) (a Botswana version of the many varieties of drums), and phala (a Botswana version of a whistle used mostly during celebrations, which comes in a variety of forms). Botswana cultural musical instruments are not confined only to the strings or drums. the hands are used as musical instruments too, by either clapping them together or against phathisi (goat skin turned inside out wrapped around the calf area; it is only used by men) to create music and rhythm. For the last few decades, the guitar has been celebrated as a versatile music instrument for Tswana music as it offers a variety in string which the Segaba instrument does not have. Other notable modern Tswana music is Tswana Rap known as Motswako.

Visual arts

Batswana are noted for their skill at crafting baskets from Mokola Palm and local dyes. The baskets are generally woven into three types: large, lidded baskets used for storage, large, open baskets for carrying objects on the head or for winnowing threshed grain, and smaller plates for winnowing pounded grain. Potters made clay pots for storing water, traditional beer and also for cooking and hardly for commercial use. Craft makers made wooden crafts and they made traditional cooking utensils such as leso and lehetlho, traditional wooden chairs and drums among others.

Tswana astronomy

Astronomy is an old age tradition in Africa. As with all other cultures, various ethnic groups developed their own interpretations of the solar system.  Using their natural instrument the eye, Batswana have observed, commented on and named celestial objects of interest to them. There are more telling and specific names that relate to unique stellar patterns and their seasonal appearance e.g. Selemela, Naka, Thutlwa, and Dikolojwane. According to Tswana culture, the stars of Orion's sword were "dintsa le Dikolobe", three dogs chasing three pigs of Orion's belt. The Milky Way was viewed by the Tswana as Molalatladi, the place where lightning rests. It was further believed that this place of rest also kept the sky from collapsing and showed the movement of time.  Some even claimed that it turned the sun to the east, in a way to explaining the rising of the sun. It was also believed that it was a supernatural footpath across the sky along which ancestors' spirits walked. The moon (Ngwedi) is said to represent a woman; it brings forth light but not as scorching as the Sun (Letsatsi) and its light is associated with happiness. Venus is called Mphatlalatsana (the brilliant and blinding one) by Batswana & Kopadilalelo (seeker of evening meals).  The southern African calendar was made up of 354 days, (12 × 29.5 day lunar month). This was 11 days shorter than the solar year, an issue which could not be ignored.  The solution was to add an additional month, when necessary, to "catch up".  Some years were 12 months long, others 13. After the arrival of Europeans and the introduction of the Gregorian calendar, it was noted that the Batswana people had started forgetting the name of the 13th month. In contrast to Europe, where the new year is in the middle of winter, in southern Africa it logically started in September or October at the start of the new growing season.

Raditladi Basin, a large peak ring impact crater on Mercury with a diameter of 263 km is named after Leetile Disang Raditladi. a Motswana playwright and poet.

Notable Batswana and people of Tswana descent

Activism, authorship, academics and science

Katlego Kai Kolanyane-Kesupile, Motswana performance artist, musician, writer and LGBT activist
Keorapetse Kgositsile, Late South African ANC activist, writer and author
Prof Dan Kgwadi, Vice-chancellor, North-West University
Z. K. Matthews, academic in South Africa, lecturing at the University of Fort Hare in 1955
Thebe Medupe, a physics professor at North West University
Dr. Matshidiso Moeti, Regional Director of the WHO Regional Office for Africa
Silas Molema, South African doctor, politician, author and activist
Mamokgethi Phakeng, Vice-Chancellor of University of Cape Town
Sol Plaatje, South African ANC activist, writer and author

Politics, royalty, activism, business and economics 

Duma Boko, lawyer, jurist and politician. He is the president of the main opposition party in Botswana – Umbrella for Democratic Change.
Frances Baard, Organiser of the African National Congress (ANC) Women's League and Trade Unionist
Bathoen I, former Kgosi (paramount chief) of the Ngwaketse
Manne Dipico, first premier of Northern Cape province, South Africa
Winkie Direko, former premier of Free State and former chancellor of University of Free State
Unity Dow, Botswana former High Court judge, author, activist and Minister
John Taolo Gaetsewe, trade unionist, member of the ANC and General Secretary of SACTU, Robben Island prisoner, banned person
Khama III, King of Bamangwato
Ian Khama, fourth President of Botswana
Seretse Khama, first President of Botswana
Moses Kotane, South African politician and activist
David Magang, Botswana lawyer, businessman and politician
Supra Mahumapelo, South African politician
Mmusi Maimane, South African politician
Toto Makgolokwe, Paramount Chief (kgosi) of the Batlharo tribe of South Africa
Lucas Mangope, former President of Bophutatswana
Quett Masire, second President of Botswana
Mokgweetsi Masisi, President of Botswana
Joe Matthews, South African politician
Naledi Pandor (née Matthews), South African politician and minister
Joe Modise, South African politician
Festus Mogae, third President of Botswana
Mogale Mogale, Chief of Bapo ba Mogale
Mogoeng Mogoeng, Chief Justice, South Africa
Job Mokgoro, South African politician and academic
Yvonne Mokgoro, former South African Constitutional Court Justice
Brian Molefe, South African businessman, appointed CEO of Transnet in February 2011, and CEO of Eskom in April 2015
Popo Molefe, first premier of North West province, South Africa
Dipuo Peters, South Africa politician, former Minister of Transport and Minister of Energy from 2009 to 2013
Edna Molewa, South African politician
Leruo Molotlegi, King of the Royal Bafokeng Nation
Ruth Mompati, South African political activist
James Moroka, one of the ANC Presidents (1949 to 1952)
Dikgang Moseneke, South African judge and former Deputy Chief Justice of South Africa
Nthato Motlana, prominent South African businessman, physician and anti-apartheid activist
Bridgette Motsepe, South African businesswoman
Patrice Motsepe, South African billionaire mining businessman
Tshepo Motsepe, First Lady of South Africa as the wife of Cyril Ramaphosa, the President of South Africa
Sebele I, former Chief (Kgosi) of the Kwena – a major Tswana tribe (morafe) in modern-day Botswana
Molefi Sefularo, South African politician
Abram Onkgopotse Tiro, South African student activist and black consciousness militant
Kgosi Puso Gaborone, the Paramount Chief (Kgosi) of the BaTlokwa tribe of Tlokweng in Botswana

Arts and media

Presley Chweneyagae, South African actor. He starred in the film Tsotsi, which won the Academy Award for Foreign Language Film.
Kgomotso Christopher, South African actress and Voice-Over artist
Khuli Chana, South African hip hop artist
Katlego Danke, South African actress
Connie Ferguson, Botswana born South African actress
Shona Ferguson, Botswana born South African businessman, actor, film producer and co-founder of Ferguson Films
DJ Fresh, Botswana born South African radio personality
Goapele, American singer with Setswana ancestry
Thebe Kgositsile, American rapper, son of Keorapetse Kgositsile
Mpule Kwelagobe, former Miss Universe
Kagiso Lediga, South African stand-up comedian, actor and director
A-Reece, South African musician
Gail Nkoane Mabalane, South African actress, model, media socialite, businesswoman and singer
Kabelo Mabalane, South African kwaito musician, songwriter and actor. He was a member of the kwaito trio TKZee.
Motsi Mabuse, South African-German dancer
Vee Mampeezy, Botswana musician
Maps Maponyane, South African television presenter, actor, fashion designer, speaker, model, voice over artist, philanthropist and entrepreneur
Bonang Matheba, South African media personality
Tim Modise, South African journalist, TV and radio presenter
Tumi Morake, South African comedian, actress, TV personality and writer. Current presenter of "Dirage" on Motsweding Fm.
Cassper Nyovest, aka "Refiloe Maele Phoolo", South African hip hop artist
Hip Hop Pantsula, South African artist
Manaka Ranaka, South African actress
Dolly Rathebe, musician and actress
Rapulana Seiphemo, South African actor
Tuks Senganga, aka "Tumelo Kepadisa", Setswana rapper
DJ Speedsta, Dj and TV personality
Boity Thulo, South African actress, hip hop artist
Redi Tlhabi, Journalist, producer, author and radio presenter
Emma Wareus, former Miss World First Princess
Zeus, aka "Game Goabaone Bantsi", Botswana born Setswana rapper

Sports
 

Itumeleng Khune, South African footballer
Lucky Lekgwathi, former South African footballer
Reneilwe Letsholonyane, South African footballer
 Gift Links
Dikgang Mabalane, South African football player
 Innocent Maela
Marks Maponyane, retired South African football player
Teko Modise, South African footballer
Stephen Mokoka, South African long-distance runner
Amantle Montsho, former world 800 metres champion
Pitso Mosimane, South African football former player and coach. Current manager of Al Ahly in the Egyptian Premier League.
Kaizer Motaung, former South African footballer and chairman f Kaizer Chiefs
Kaizer Motaung Junior, former South African footballer
Katlego Mphela, South African footballer
Victor Mpitsang, South African cricketer, fast bowler who has played for South Africa, currently cricket National Convenor of Selectors
Kagiso Rabada, South African cricketer. He debut for South Africa in November 2014 and by July 2018 he had topped both the ICC ODI bowler rankings and the ICC Test bowler rankings aged 22.
Jimmy Tau, former South African footballer
Percy Tau, South African footballer
Baboloki Thebe, Commonwealth 800 metres silver medalist. 4x4 Commonwealth gold medalist.
Alister Walker, Botswana professional squash player
Letsile Tebogo, Botswana sprinter

Religion
 

Frederick Samuel Modise, founder of the International Pentecostal Holiness Church
Glayton Modise, the International Pentecostal Holiness Church leader

See also 
 Sotho-Tswana peoples
 Demographics of Botswana
 Langeberg Rebellion (1896–97)

References

External links

 WorldStatesmen website on political and administrative entities, per present state
 Archive.lib.msu.edu
 Origins | Bakgatla Archive
 The languages of South Africa – SouthAfrica.info